Olle Boström (31 March 1926 – 31 July 2010) was a Swedish archer. He competed in the men's individual event at the 1972 Summer Olympics.

References

External links
 

1926 births
2010 deaths
Swedish male archers
Olympic archers of Sweden
Archers at the 1972 Summer Olympics
People from Forshaga Municipality
Sportspeople from Värmland County
20th-century Swedish people